The Lester and Haltom No. 1 Well Site is the site of the first discovery of oil in the state of Arkansas in 1920. The site is overgrown, with limited evidence of its past. A tar-blackened trail shows where there was runoff from the well, whose drill hole was just to the south of the mud pit. East of the mud pit is another depression where the steam engine was mounted; there is still a turnbuckle embedded in a nearby tree.

The well on this site blew on April 14, 1920, was operated for only a short time, producing 70 to 100 barrels per day for a few months before running dry, and was not commercially viable.  The site was listed on the National Register of Historic Places in 1976.

See also

National Register of Historic Places listings in Ouachita County, Arkansas

References

National Register of Historic Places in Arkansas
National Register of Historic Places in Ouachita County, Arkansas
Petroleum in Arkansas
1920 establishments in Arkansas
Energy infrastructure completed in 1920
Oil wells on the National Register of Historic Places
Energy infrastructure in Arkansas